This is a list of yearly Metro Atlantic Athletic Conference football standings.

MAAC standings

References

Metro Atlantic Athletic Conference
Standings